Gymnopilus croceoluteus is a species of mushroom-forming fungus in the family Hymenogastraceae.

Description

Habitat and distribution
Gymnopilus croceoluteus has been found growing on coniferous wood, in Michigan (November), Florida (July), and Idaho (June).

See also

List of Gymnopilus species

References

croceoluteus
Fungi described in 1969
Taxa named by Lexemuel Ray Hesler